Charles Daniel Crofts (30 August 1822 – 15 April 1893) was an English cricketer.  Crofts' batting and bowling styles are unknown.

Crofts was born at Lewes, Sussex, and was educated at Winchester College and St John's College, Cambridge. He made a single first-class appearance for Sussex against Nottinghamshire in 1840 at Trent Bridge.  In Sussex's first-innings, he was dismissed for a duck by Thomas Barker, while in their second-innings he was dismissed for the same score by Sam Redgate.  While studying at the University of Cambridge, he later made two first-class appearances for Cambridge University Cricket Club against Cambridge Town Club and Oxford University in 1843, though with little success.

He died at Caythorpe, Lincolnshire, on 15 April 1893.

References

External links

1822 births
1893 deaths
People from Lewes
People educated at Winchester College
English cricketers
Sussex cricketers
Alumni of St John's College, Cambridge
Cambridge University cricketers
People from Caythorpe, Lincolnshire